Tangfang Township is a township in west-central Shaanxi province, Northwest China, located more than  west of the provincial capital of Xi'an. It is under the administration of Xingping,  to the east-northeast.

Situated along a major east-west road connecting the provincial capital, Xi'an, to Baoji, Tangfang has regular transport links into Fufeng County.

It lies north of the Wei River yet is not on the floodplain.

Economy 

The main staple of the people in Tangfang is agriculture and farming. There is also a brick works / storage site in the village.

References 

Township-level divisions of Shaanxi